The Grosser Preis von Bayern is a Group 1 flat horse race in Germany open to thoroughbreds aged three years or older. It is run at Munich Racecourse over a distance of 2,400 metres (about 1½ miles), and it is scheduled to take place each year in early November.

History
The event was established in 1957, and it was originally held at Gelsenkirchen and called the Aral-Pokal. The first three runnings were contested over 2,600 metres, and it was cut to 2,400 metres in 1960.

The present system of race grading was introduced in Germany in 1972, and the Aral-Pokal was initially classed at Group 2 level. It was promoted to Group 1 status in 1973.

The race became known as the Grosser Erdgas-Preis in 1998. It was transferred to Cologne in 2001, and from this point it was sponsored by Credit Suisse and titled the Credit Suisse Private Banking Pokal. It was renamed the Rheinland-Pokal, after the Rhineland region, in 2004. In 2012 it was transferred to Munich racecourse and renamed the Grosser Preis von Bayern.  In 2014 it was moved from mid-August to its current slot in November.

Records
Most successful horse (2 wins):
 Luciano – 1967, 1968
 Athenagoras – 1973, 1974
 Wladimir – 1977, 1978
 Wauthi – 1980, 1981
 Acatenango – 1985, 1986
 Mondrian – 1989, 1990
 Luso – 1996, 1998
 Guignol - 2016, 2017

Leading jockey (4 wins):
 Oskar Langner – Andalusier (1958), Kronzeuge (1965), Luciano (1967, 1968)
 Fritz Drechsler – Waidmannsheil (1960), Fontanus (1966), Alpenkönig (1970), Basalt (1971)
 Peter Remmert – Mercurius (1963), Wauthi (1981), Solo (1983), Kondor (1987)
 Filip Minarik - Temida (2012), Ivanhowe (2014), Ito (2015), Guignol (2017)

Leading trainer (10 wins):
 Sven von Mitzlaff – Andalusier (1958), Kronzeuge (1965), Luciano (1967, 1968), Athenagoras (1973, 1974), Kandia (1976), Königsstuhl (1979), Orofino (1982), Las Vegas (1984)

Leading owner (6 wins):

 Gestüt Schlenderhan - Alpenkonig (1970), Arratos (1972), Catella (2000), Wiener Waltzer (2009), Ivanhowe (2014), Ito (2015)

Winners

See also

 List of German flat horse races
 Recurring sporting events established in 1957  – this race is included under its original title, Aral-Pokal.

References
 Racing Post:

 galopp-sieger.de – Rheinland-Pokal.
 horseracingintfed.com – International Federation of Horseracing Authorities – Grosser Preis von Bayern (2018).
 pedigreequery.com – Rheinland-Pokal – Köln.
 tbheritage.com – Rheinland-Pokal.

Horse races in Germany
Open middle distance horse races
Sport in Cologne
1957 establishments in West Germany
Recurring sporting events established in 1957